The Molapo Armoured Regiment (formerly Regiment Mooirivier) is a reserve armoured regiment of the South African Army.

History

Origin
The regiment was founded in 1941 as 2 Anti Tank Regiment and re-instituted in 1954 by the first vice-rector of the Potchefstroom University, Professor Fanus du Plessis.

During 1955 the regiment was converted to an armoured car regiment and renamed Regiment Hendrik Potgieter. In 1959 the Regiment was renamed Regiment Mooirivier.

Under the SADF
This unit served in South Africa's various internal conflicts as well as during the South African Border War, including duty in South-West Africa and cross-border raids into Angola between 1975 and 1984. The regiment participated in Operations Askari, Modular, Hooper and Packer. The regiment was equipped with Eland 90s at that stage.

Divisional affiliation
 8th South African Armoured Division
82 Mechanised Brigade

Under the SANDF
82 Mechanised Brigade Division was disbanded, and Regiment Mooirivier was transferred to the new armoured 'type' formation, the South African Army Armoured Formation.

Current equipment
The Regiment currently uses the Rooikat armoured fighting vehicle, equipped with a 76 mm quick-fire gun.

Name Change
In August 2019, 52 Reserve Force units had their names changed to reflect the diverse military history of South Africa. Regiment Mooirivier became the Molapo Armoured Regiment, and have 3 years to design and implement new regimental insignia.

Regimental Symbols
Regimental motto: Semper Prorsum.

Previous dress insignia

Leadership

References

Armoured regiments of South Africa
Military units and formations in Potchefstroom
Military units and formations established in 1954
Military units and formations of South Africa in the Border War